The Forum AID Award was a Nordic architecture and design award, given annually by the Swedish magazine Forum AID. AID is an acronym for the three subject-matters of the magazine - Architecture, Interior design and Design - and it is also the three categories of the award. It is given to the designers of the "Best Building [interior design and design in the Nordic Countries" that year. The award was founded in 2004 and is presented at a ceremony in Stockholm

The selection process is carried out in two stages. Each Nordic country is represented through its selection committee. The task of the committees is to select the best objects in their respective countries or by their countrymen abroad. The committees choose freely from those objects that had been carried out during the period October 1, to September 30, the year before. The winner is chosen by an international jury.

A - Architecture

2009
Building: Mountain Dwellings, Ørestad, CopenhagenArchitect: Bjarke Ingels Group/Julien de Smedt, Denmark.

2008
Building: Ørestad College, Ørestad, CopenhagenArchitect: 3xN Architects, Denmark

2007
Tautra Maria Convent, Tautra, Norway
Architect: Jensen & Skodvin, Norway

2006
Building: VM Houses, Ørestad, CopenhagenArchitect: Bjarke Ingels Group/Julien de Smedt, Denmark.

I - Interior design

2009
Cristal Bar by Katrin Olina Petursdóttir. Iceland. Client: Zenses

2008
Xile by Mats Karlsson, Sweden

2007
Baron House, Ystad, Sweden
Architect: John Pawson Ltd
Client: Fabien Baron and Malin Ericson

D - Design

2009
Design: Plopp by Oskar Zieta
Client: Hay. Denmark

2008
Design: Nobody Chair by Komplot Design, Denmark
Client: Hey, Denmark

2007
Design: North Tiles by Ronan & Erwan Bouroullec
Client: Kvadrat, Denmark

Jury

2009
The jury consisted of Chairman Marcus Fairs (the man behind Icon and Dezeen), Manuelle Gautrand, Sean Griffiths and Dirk Wynants.

2008
The jury consisted of chairman Detlef Rahe (internationally renowned architect and designer), Hans Ibelings (editor and publisher of the magazine A10 - new European architecture), Lorraine Farrelly
(acting head of the School of Architecture at the University of Portsmouth) and Johan Valcke (one of the founders of Design Flanders).

2007
Deyan Sudjic (chairman), Ellen van Loon, Johanna Grawunder, Patricia Urquiola.

2006
Detlef Rahe (chairperson), Hélène Binet, Peter Cook, Kristin Feireiss, Satyendra Pakhale

References

Architecture awards
Design awards
Swedish awards